Test equipment is a general term describing equipment used in many fields. Types of test equipment include:

Electrical and electronic test equipment

Electrical test equipment

Battery tester, used to test the state of an electric battery
Continuity tester, used to determine if an electrical path can be established between two points
Cable tester, used to verify the electrical connections in a signal cable or other wired assembly
Receptacle tester, used to verify that an AC wall outlet is wired properly
Test light, used to determine the presence or absence of an electric voltage
Hipot tester, used to verify electrical insulation in finished products carrying high electrical potential

Electronic test equipment

Electronic test equipment is used to create signals and capture responses from electronic devices, to prove proper operation or trace faults. Types of electronic test equipment include:
Automatic test equipment, any apparatus that performs tests using automation
Built-in test equipment, passive fault management and diagnosis equipment built into airborne systems to support maintenance
On-board diagnostics, test equipment for automobiles
Transistor tester, used to test the electrical behavior of transistors and solid-state diodes

Mechanical test equipment
Adhesion tester, used to determine if a paint or coating will adhere properly to a substrate
Brake tester, used to calculate the braking efforts and efficiencies of a motor vehicle
Deadweight tester, a calibration tool for pressure gauges

 
Broad-concept articles